Cicadetta is a genus of generally small-bodied annual cicadas widespread across portions of the Palearctic, Indomalayan, and Afrotropical realms. In older scientific and taxonomic literature, this genus was popularly referred to as Melampsalta. These cicadas occur in a diverse spectrum of habitats, although most taxa are typically associated with weedy meadows and tallgrass prairie ecosystems. Several related species from North America were recently transferred to the genus Cicadettana.

Many members of the genus inhabit Southern Europe, Greece, Anatolia, and coastal Mediterranean regions, and they have a long history of association with the civilizations of those areas; revered by many cultures for their complex, loud, and sometimes melodic courtship calls.

Most of the cicadas within this genus are classified by conservation groups as least concern, although many species are endemic to a particular isolated area or threatened by habitat loss primarily due to grazing.

Species
These 45 species belong to the genus Cicadetta:

 Cicadetta abscondita Lee, 2008
 Cicadetta afghanistanica Dlabola, 1964
 Cicadetta albipennis Fieber, 1876
 Cicadetta anapaistica Hertach, 2011
 Cicadetta brevipennis Fieber, 1876
 Cicadetta cantilatrix Sueur & Puissant, 2007
 Cicadetta cerdaniensis Puissant & Boulard, 2000
 Cicadetta chaharensis (Kato, 1938)
 Cicadetta concinna (Germar, 1821)
 Cicadetta diminuta Horváth, 1907
 Cicadetta dirfica Gogala, Trilar & Drosopoulos, 2011
 Cicadetta fangoana Boulard, 1976
 Cicadetta fraseri (China, 1938)
 Cicadetta haematophleps Fieber, 1876
 Cicadetta hageni Fieber, 1872
 Cicadetta hannekeae Gogala, Drosopoulos & Trilar, 2008
 Cicadetta hodoharai (Kato, 1940)
 Cicadetta inglisi (Ollenbach, 1929)
 Cicadetta inserta Horváth, 1911
 Cicadetta intermedia (Ollenbach, 1929)
 Cicadetta juncta (Walker, 1850)
 Cicadetta kissavi Gogala, Drosopoulos & Trilar, 2009
 Cicadetta kollari Fieber, 1876
 Cicadetta konoi (Kato, 1937)
 Cicadetta laevifrons (Stål, 1870)
 Cicadetta macedonica Schedl, 1999
 Cicadetta mediterranea Fieber, 1876
 Cicadetta minuta (Ollenbach, 1929)
 Cicadetta montana (Scopoli, 1772)
 Cicadetta nigropilosa Logvinenko, 1976
 Cicadetta olympica Gogala, Drosopoulos & Trilar, 2009
 Cicadetta pellosoma (Uhler, 1861)
 Cicadetta petrophila Popov, Arnov & Sergeeva, 1985
 Cicadetta petryi Schumacher, 1924
 Cicadetta pieli (Kato, 1940)
 Cicadetta pilosa Horváth, 1901
 Cicadetta podolica (Eichwald, 1830)
 Cicadetta shansiensis (Esaki & Ishihara, 1950)
 Cicadetta sibillae Hertach & Trilar, 2015
 Cicadetta transylvanica Fieber, 1876
 Cicadetta tumidifrons Horváth, 1911
 Cicadetta tunisiaca (Karsch, 1890)
 Cicadetta ventricosa (Stål, 1866)
 Cicadetta viridicincta (Ashton, 1912)
 Cicadetta walkerella Kirkaldy, 1909

References

 Gogala, M. ; T. Trilar & S. Drosopoulos, 2011: Two new species and a new genus of Cicadettini (Hemiptera, Cicadidae) from the Greek island of Evia. Deutsche Entomologische Zeitschrift 58 (1): 105-117. Abstract: .
 Hertach, T. 2011: Spectacular song pattern from the Sicilian Mountains: The new cicada species Cicadetta anapaistica sp. n. (Hemiptera: Cicadidae). Zootaxa, 2771: 25-40. 
 Sanborn, A.F. 2009: A new species of Cicadetta (Hemiptera: Cicadomorpha: Cicadidae) from Hispaniola. Caribbean journal of science, 45(1): 1-7. 
T. Hertach et al., 2015: "Songs, genetics, and morphology: revealing the taxonomic units in the European Cicadetta cerdaniensis cicada group, with a description of new taxa (Hemiptera: Cicadidae)", Zoological Journal of the Linnean Society, Volume 173, Issue 2, pages 320–351, .

External links

NCBI
 

Taxa named by Friedrich August Rudolph Kolenati
Cicadettini
Cicadidae genera